Events in the year 1850 in India.

Events
National income - ₹5,910 million
The ceremony of turning the first sod for the Great Indian Peninsula Railway from Mumbai to Kalyan was performed by J. P. Willoughby at a place near Sion.

Law
Judicial Officers Protection Act
Piracy Act (British statute)

Births
9 September – Bharatendu Harishchandra, writer and poet (died 1882).

 
India
Years of the 19th century in India